Franz-Josef Wolfframm (22 October 1934 – 3 July 2015) was a German footballer who played as a midfielder.

Career
Wolfframm played for Fortuna Düsseldorf between 1957 and 1964, scoring 75 goals in 170 league appearances. With the club he was a runner-up in the German Cup final on three occasions. After leaving in 1964 he spent two years with Bayer Leverkusen.

Later life and death
Wolfframm died on 3 July 2015, at the age of 80.

References

1934 births
2015 deaths
German footballers
Fortuna Düsseldorf players
Bayer 04 Leverkusen players
Association football midfielders
Sportspeople from Krefeld
Footballers from North Rhine-Westphalia
West German footballers